Khasial Union is an Union Parishad under Lohagara Upazila of Narail District in the division of Khulna, Bangladesh. It has an area of 88.87 km2 (34.31 sq mi) and a population of 19,211.

References

Unions of Kalia Upazila
Unions of Narail District
Unions of Khulna Division